Tingmerkpuk River is a stream in North Slope Borough, Alaska, in the United States. It is a tributary of the Kokolik River.

Tingmerkpuk is derived from an Eskimo word meaning "eagle".

See also
List of rivers of Alaska

References

Rivers of North Slope Borough, Alaska
Rivers of Alaska